Jacopo Da Riva (born 27 October 2000) is an Italian professional footballer who plays as a midfielder for  club Como on loan from Atalanta.

Club career
Da Riva joined the youth academy of Atalanta in 2015. On 1 August 2020, Da Riva made his senior debut for the club in a 2–0 Serie A loss to Inter Milan. Eleven days later, he made his debut in the UEFA Champions League against Paris Saint-Germain.

On 5 October 2020, he joined Serie B club Vicenza on loan.

On 24 August 2021, he joined SPAL on loan.

On 1 September 2022, Da Riva was loaned to Como.

References

External links
 
 

2000 births
Living people
People from Montebelluna
Italian footballers
Association football midfielders
Atalanta B.C. players
L.R. Vicenza players
S.P.A.L. players
Como 1907 players
Serie A players
Serie B players
Sportspeople from the Province of Treviso
Footballers from Veneto